Wissam Kadhim (born January 1986 in Iraq) is an Iraqi football (soccer) midfielder. He currently plays for the Al-Shorta football club in Iraq. He made one game for the Iraqi national team. He won the 2002 Arab Police Championship.

External links
 Profile on Goalzz.com

1986 births
Living people
Iraqi footballers
Al-Zawraa SC players
Al-Shorta SC players
Association football midfielders
Iraq international footballers